Richard Joseph McGuire (January 26, 1926 – February 3, 2010) was an American professional basketball player and coach.

One of the premier guards of the 1950s, McGuire spent 11 seasons in the NBA (1949–60), eight with the New York Knicks and three with the Detroit Pistons. McGuire led the league in assists during his rookie season with a then-record 386 assists, and was among the league's top ten playmakers for ten of his 11 seasons.  He was an NBA All-Star seven times (1951,'52, '54-'56, '58, '59), and was named to the All-NBA Second Team in 1951.

McGuire became player-coach for the Pistons in his last season (1959–60), and coached them until 1963. He also coached the Knicks for three seasons, beginning in 1965. He compiled a 197-260 coaching record. McGuire was working as a senior consultant for the Knicks when he died on February 3, 2010, of a ruptured aortic aneurysm at age 84.

McGuire's brother Al was also a prominent figure in basketball who coached Marquette University to the 1977 NCAA basketball championship. They are the only pair of brothers inducted into the Naismith Memorial Basketball Hall of Fame. His nephew, Allie, also played in the NBA.

The Knicks retired number 15 a second time for McGuire in 1992 (six years earlier, it had been retired for Earl Monroe).

McGuire was inducted into the Suffolk Sports Hall of Fame on Long Island in the Basketball Category with the Class of 1994.

NBA career statistics

Regular season

Playoffs

References

External links
 BasketballReference.com: Dick McGuire (as coach)
 BasketballReference.com: Dick McGuire (as player)
 

1926 births
2010 deaths
All-American college men's basketball players
American men's basketball coaches
American men's basketball players
Basketball coaches from New York (state)
Basketball players from New York City
Dartmouth Big Green men's basketball players
Deaths from aortic aneurysm
Detroit Pistons head coaches
Detroit Pistons players
Naismith Memorial Basketball Hall of Fame inductees
National Basketball Association All-Stars
National Basketball Association players with retired numbers
National Collegiate Basketball Hall of Fame inductees
New York Knicks draft picks
New York Knicks head coaches
New York Knicks players
Player-coaches
Point guards
Sportspeople from the Bronx
St. John's Red Storm men's basketball players